The name Lupit has been used for four tropical cyclones in the western north Pacific Ocean. The name was contributed by the Philippines and means "cruelty" or "viciousness" in Tagalog.

 Typhoon Lupit (2003) (T0321, 26W, Yoyoy) – a powerful Category 5 super typhoon that caused an unknown amount of damage in the Federated States of Micronesia.
 Typhoon Lupit (2009) (T0920, 22W, Ramil) – another powerful Category 5 super typhoon that formed northwest of Kwajalein, and recurved off Luzon, becoming extratropical northeast of Japan.
 Tropical Storm Lupit (2016) (T1602, 04W) – a tropical storm that formed east of Japan.
 Tropical Storm Lupit (2021) (T2109, 13W, Huaning) – a weak storm that affected Southeast China, Taiwan and Japan.

Pacific typhoon set index articles